Gil Torres may refer to:

Gil Torres (cardinal) (d. 1254), Spanish cleric
Gil Torres (baseball player) (1915–1983), Cuban athlete